Nina Gabrielyan is a Russian-Armenian writer and artist. She was born in Moscow in 1953, and studied at the Moscow State Pedagogical Institute of Foreign Languages. She has published in a variety of genres, including poetry and fiction. Her collection of stories Master of the Grass has been translated into English under the Glas New Russian Writing imprint. 

She trained as an artist with Boris Otarov. She works mainly in oil and crayon, and has exhibited widely in Russia and Armenia.

References

Soviet writers
Soviet artists
20th-century Russian writers
Armenian artists
Russian people of Armenian descent
1953 births
Living people